NOVA Entertainment is an Australian entertainment company that operates commercial radio networks (and associated digital brands) in metropolitan and regional areas of Australia. 

NOVA Entertainment is owned by Lachlan Murdoch's Illyria Pty Ltd which purchased the remaining 50% it did not own from Daily Mail and General Trust in September 2012.

History
Nova Entertainment was formed in early 1996 under the name DMG Radio Australia, followed later in the year with the A$46M acquisition of 85% of the Broadcast Media group of regional stations. This was shortly followed by FIVEaa on 26 September 1996. The founding Chairman and CEO were Charlie Cox and Paul Thompson respectively.  The company grew rapidly to over 64 radio stations across New South Wales, Victoria, South Australia, Queensland and Western Australia under the Star FM, Hot FM, Nova and Vega (now Smooth) brands.

In September 2004, DMG Radio Australia sold most of its regional radio stations to Macquarie Bank, keeping only Hot 91 Sunshine Coast (later sold in early 2005) and Star 104.5 in Gosford, which they still own and operate.

In April 2009, DMG Radio Australia launched two new digital radio stations: NovaNation, a 24/7 digital dance station and Koffee, a chillout music station. These stations were launched as part of the introduction of DAB+ digital broadcasting in Australia's major state capital cities. On 24 December 2013, NovaNation and Koffee both ceased broadcasting as DAB+ stations. Koffee was rebranded to smooth Chill with a chill easy listening format and NovaNation ceased broadcasting online by mid-2016.

On Friday 12 March 2010 Vega rebranded with the name Classic Rock to counteract similar stations Gold 104.3, WSFM, Triple M Sydney and Triple M Melbourne. Nova Entertainment announced the change to Vega's brand as the stations had struggled towards the bottom of the ratings ladder in both Sydney and Melbourne. In building these new stations DMG Radio needed a "simple, focused music concept that would appeal to the 35-54 audience," according to CEO Cathy O'Connor. The stations later became 91.5 FM in Melbourne and 95.3 FM in Sydney.

On Monday 21 May 2012, after poor ratings, 91.5 FM Melbourne and 95.3 FM Sydney were rebranded again to smoothfm with a new smooth, easy listening format to aim for women aged 35+.

In December 2013, DMG Radio Australia launched a 24-hour Australian pay television music channel, Smooth available via Foxtel satellite and cable services. The pay television music channel extends from the smoothfm radio brand. It was shut down on 30 June 2020.

In February 2014, DMG Radio Australia rebranded under the name Nova Entertainment to reflect the company's increasingly diversified interests in radio and the media and entertainment industries. The new company name has been developed to encapsulate both the pride and heritage of the company’s original and successful FM launch brand, Nova, with its recent evolution into the broader media and entertainment space.

Current operations

Radio 
NOVA Entertainment owns two national radio networks and four independent radio stations with a presence across Australia through terrestrial, digital and online

NOVA 

The Nova Network is a commercial radio network with an adult contemporary format. All network stations are owned and operated by NOVA entertainment and each station has its own local Breakfast show with daytime, drive and night shifts networked across all stations.

smoothfm 

smoothfm is a commercial radio network originally launched in 2012 as a rebrand of the Classic Rock network. Since February 14 2020 the network's primary format is Hot-Adult Contemporary providing feel good and dance music.

Non-network radio 
In addition to its network-based assets, NOVA also operates four independent radio stations.

Other 
novafm.com.au, online news, music & lifestyle portal
smooth.com.au, online news, music & lifestyle portal
fiveaa.com.au, online news portal
star1045.com.au, online news, music & lifestyle portal

Former operations

NovaNation 

NovaNation was a 24/7 dance music radio station that broadcast on DAB+ and online. It was marketed as Australia's first 'digital' dance station in an effort to differentiate itself from its analog competitors.

Early in 2013, NovaNation was removed in Adelaide and Perth and replaced by a DAB+ syndication of smoothfm. It was removed in Sydney, Melbourne and Brisbane on the 24th of December 2013 and replaced by Coles Radio. The station was accessible online until mid-2016, when it ceased streaming. The NovaNation brand is still used for weekend content on the NovaFM stations.

Foxtel Smooth 

Foxtel Smooth was an 18-hour pay television music channel (time-shared with Foxtel Arts) available via Foxtel satellite and cable services. It launched on 3 December 2013, dedicated to easy listening adult contemporary music. The channel ceased broadcasting on 30 June 2020.

GOAT 
GOAT was a pop culture, news and entertainment website aimed at a millennial audience. It has been dormant since 2018.

See also 
List of radio stations in Australia

References

External links 
NOVA Entertainment
Nova 969 Sydney
Nova 100 Melbourne
Nova 937 Perth
Nova 919 Adelaide
Nova 106.9 Brisbane
smoothfm 95.3 Sydney
smoothfm 91.5 Melbourne
FIVEaa Adelaide
Star 104.5FM Central Coast

 
Daily Mail and General Trust
Nova Entertainment
Australian radio networks
Contemporary hit radio stations in Australia
Mass media companies established in 1996